The 1920 Idaho gubernatorial election was held on November 2, 1920. Incumbent Republican D. W. Davis defeated Democratic nominee Ted A. Walters with 52.97% of the vote.

General election

Candidates
Major party candidates
D. W. Davis, Republican 
Ted A. Walters, Democratic

Other candidates
Sherman D. Fairchild, Independent

Results

References

1920
Idaho
Gubernatorial